The Association of Belarusians in Great Britain (Zhurtavańnie bielarusaŭ u Vialikaj Brytanii) is the oldest Belarusian organisation in the United Kingdom uniting members of the Belarusian diaspora since the late 1940s until the present day.

History 

After the end of World War II, several thousand ethnic Belarusians landed in Britain. Most of these people were former soldiers of the Polish Anders Army. Some of them were stationed in Britain during the war (1st Polish corps), with the bulk arriving from Italy with the 2nd Polish corps. The ranks were further swelled by arrival of so-called ‘displaced persons’ who found themselves outside Belarus during the war.

In 1946 the Association of Belarusians in Great Britain was established, with Dr. Vincent Žuk-Hryškievič as its chair. It soon became a “well-established and growing organisation”.

The organisation had branches in London, Manchester and Bradford and acquired several buildings for its activities, including the Belarusian House in Islington, London. It became the first organization of the Belarusian diaspora established by the wave of emigrants from Belarus after World War II.

With the support of the association, the Anglo-Belarusian Society was established in 1954 with the aim to promote Belarusian-British contacts.

Present day 
The Association’s present-day activities include among others:

 commemoration of notable events in the history of the Belarusian independence movement, such as the proclamation of the Belarusian Democratic Republic in 1918 and the Slutsk Uprising in 1921;
 collaboration with and support of the Belarusian Democracy Movement, the 2020-2021 Belarusian protests;
 financial support of Belarusian cultural projects;
 organisation of meetings in Britain with prominent Belarusian cultural and political figures;
 engagement with British politicians and journalists.

In 2018 the Association organised celebrations of the centenary of the proclamation of the Belarusian Democratic Republic at the Palace of Westminster.

Mikalaj Packajeu is the current  head of the Association.

Notable members
 Dr. Vincent Žuk-Hryškievič
Ceslaus Sipovich
 Alexander Nadson
 Paval Navara
Helen Michaluk
 Andrej Aliaksandraŭ

References

External links
 Official website

1946 establishments in the United Kingdom
Belarusian diaspora in Europe
Ethnic organisations based in the United Kingdom
British people of Belarusian descent
Belarus–United Kingdom relations
Organizations established in 1946